NGC 6781 is a planetary nebula located in the equatorial constellation of Aquila, about 2.5° east-northeast of the 5th magnitude star 19 Aquilae. It was discovered July 30, 1788 by the Anglo-German astronomer William Herschel.

The bipolar dust shell of this nebula is believed to be barrel-shaped and is being viewed from nearly pole-on.

The magnitude 16.88 central star of the planetary nebula is a white dwarf with a spectral type of DAO. It has an M-type co-moving companion at a projected separation of under . It left the AGB and entered the cooling stage around 9,400 years ago.

References

External links

Planetary nebulae
6781
Aquila (constellation)